"Crick Neck"  is a song by Jamaican dancehall recording artist Sean Paul, featuring vocals from Chi Ching Ching. The song was released as a digital download in the United Kingdom on 26 August 2016 through Island Records. The song was written by Sean Paul Henriques, Yannick Rastogi, Zacharie Raymond, Jordan McClure, David Hayle and Radion Beckford. Production was handled by Banx & Ranx (Yannick Rastogi & Zacharie Raymond) and Chimney (Jordan McClure & David Hayle). The song peaked at 140 on the UK Singles Chart.

Charts

Release history

References

2016 songs
2016 singles
Sean Paul songs
Songs written by Sean Paul